The Île-aux-Perroquets lighthouse is a lighthouse on the Île aux Perroquets in the Mingan Archipelago, Gulf of St. Lawrence, Quebec, Canada.
It was built in 1951, replacing an 1888 wooden lighthouse. It received heritage designation in 2014.

Location

The Île aux Perroquets Lighthouse is on the Île aux Perroquets, an island at the western end of the Mingan Archipelago on the north shore of the Gulf of Saint Lawrence.
It is in the Mingan Archipelago National Park Reserve, and the Longue-Pointe-de-Mingan municipality.
In the Innu-aimun language the island is called Utshishtunishekau, meaning nest-shaped rock.
The French name means "parrot island", and refers to the Atlantic puffin, a bird with a brightly colored beak.

It has steep cliffs, almost vertical on the east side but sloping more gently on the south side.
Fauna include the Atlantic puffin (Fratercula arctica), razorbill (Alca torda), black guillemot (Cepphus grylle), black-legged kittiwake (Rissa tridactyla) and common raven (Corvus corax). 
These species generally nest in the island's cliffs and scree. 
The island is also home to the common eider (Somateria mollissima) and some species of gull.

1888 tower

The first lighthouse was wooden and was built in 1888. The 1888 Annual Report of the Department of Marine and Fisheries included the following information:

The first keeper was Henry de Puyjalon, a French count who had moved from Brittany to Canada in 1872. He married the daughter of Gédéon Ouimet, former Quebec premier, and became the provincial Inspector-General of hunting and fishing. He accepted the position of lighthouse keeper in 1888 due to his love of the rugged beauty of the North Shore. He was succeeded by Charles-Eustache Forgues in 1891, who died in a boat accident after a year, and was succeeded by Placide Vigneau.

Placide Vigneau was the lighthouse keeper until 1912, when his son Hector succeeded him. He was the author of the Histoire or Journal de la Pointe aux Esquimaux. His work bears witness to the life of the inhabitants of Côte-Nord. In 1918 a diaphone fog alarm was installed on the island. Hector Vigneault retired in 1948 and was replaced by J. Robert Kavanagh, who served until 1976. The last keeper was John Collin (1976–1978)

1951 tower
A replacement tower was built in 1951 as part of a lighthouse modernization program after World War II, and is typical of replacement towers designed by the Department of Transport during that period. The lighthouse has a neoclassical design  with octagonal base, shaft and capital. It is a tapered octagonal three-story tower.
There is a decorative vent cover above the red octagonal fiberglass lantern. There is a triangular pediment over the main door, and flat concrete hoods over the windows. The tower is painted white with red detailing.

The tower was fully automated in 1981. In 2005 Parks Canada allocated $125,000 towards restoration of both of the Mingan Archipelago lighthouses. The Île aux Perroquets Corporation was formed in 2010 with the goal of preserving and restoring the lighthouse. Some restoration work was undertaken in 2012.

In addition to the tower, the site includes a boathouse (stage) built in 1908–1915, the houses of the senior keeper and assistant keeper, both from 1951, the 1952 chicken coop and forge building, the 1954 storage shed and a fog alarm building from the 1950s.

The lighthouse received heritage designation in 2014, the first in Quebec, and was transferred to the Corporation de l'Île aux Perroquets.
Boat tours to the lighthouse are available, and the keeper's house is available for visitors to stay overnight. 
The site is owned by the Canadian Coast Guard and managed by the Mingan Archipelago National Park Reserve.
As of 2021 the lighthouse was still operational.

Notes

Sources

Lighthouses in Quebec